The 2012 FIFA Futsal World Cup was the seventh FIFA Futsal World Cup, the quadrennial international futsal championship contested by the men's national teams of the member associations of FIFA. It took place from 1 to 18 November 2012 in Thailand. An extra four teams (increase to 24 from 20 at the 2008 event in Brazil) were competing at this World Cup. This was the first FIFA men's tournament held in Southeast Asia since the Malaysia 1997 FIFA World Youth Championship, and was the first FIFA men's tournament held in the country, having hosted the 2004 FIFA U-19 Women's World Championship.

Defending champions Brazil won the title for the fifth time, defeating Spain in a rematch of the 2008 final.

Bid process
On 20 July 2009, FIFA launched the bidding for the 2012 FIFA Futsal World Cup with the following timeline:

Declaration of interest: 1 September 2009, deadline for the member associations to declare their interest in hosting the tournament.
FIFA Hosting Agreements: 30 September 2009, deadline for FIFA to send out the Hosting Agreements to those associations who have declared an interest to host the tournament.
Bidding Agreement: 15 November 2009, deadline for the member associations to reconfirm their interest in bidding the tournament.
Hosting Agreement: 15 January 2010, deadline for the member associations to submit the signed Hosting Agreements.
Appointment of hosts by the FIFA Executive Committee: March 2010.

On 19 March 2010, during its Executive Committee meeting, FIFA chose Thailand to host the 2012 FIFA Futsal World Cup. Thailand beat bids from China, Iran, Azerbaijan, Czech Republic, Sri Lanka and Guatemala.

Qualification

The host nation, Thailand, qualified automatically.

Qualified nations

1.Teams that will make their debut.

Venues
The matches were originally due to take place across four venues. Due to construction delays and failure to meet the security requirement, early matches scheduled at the Bangkok Futsal Arena were moved to the Indoor Stadium Huamark. After the final inspection on 5 November, FIFA announced that the Bangkok Futsal Arena had not sufficiently met the criteria. The two quarter-final matches would be played at Nimibutr Stadium, while Indoor Stadium Huamark would host the semifinals and the final.

Squads

Each team submitted a squad of 14 players, including two goalkeepers. The squads were announced on 25 October 2012.

Match officials
The following were the officials for the 2012 FIFA Futsal World Cup.

Draw
The official draw for the World Cup was held at the St. Regis Hotel in Bangkok, Thailand on 24 August 2012.

The 24 teams were divided in six groups, each group with four teams.

First round
The group winners and runners up along with the 4 highest rank third places advanced to the round of 16.

The ranking of each team in each group will be determined as follows:
 greatest number of points obtained in all group matches;
 goal difference in all group matches;
 greatest number of goals scored in all group matches;
If two or more teams are equal on the basis of the above three criteria, their 
rankings will be determined as follows:
 greatest number of points obtained in the group matches  between the teams concerned;
 goal difference resulting from the group matches between the teams concerned;
 greater number of goals scored in all group matches between the teams concerned;
 drawing of lots by the FIFA Organising Committee.

All times are Thailand Standard Time (UTC+07:00).

Group A

Group B

Group C

Group D

Group E

Group F

Ranking of third-placed teams

Knockout phase
In the knockout stages, if a match is level at the end of normal playing time, extra time shall be played (two periods of five minutes each) and followed, if necessary, by kicks from the penalty mark to determine the winner. However, for the third place match, no extra time shall be played and the winner shall be determined by kicks from the penalty mark.

Round of 16

Quarterfinals

Semifinals

Third place match

Final

Champions

Goalscorers
9 goals
 Eder Lima

8 goals
 Rodolfo Fortino

7 goals

 Fernandinho
 Neto
 Saad Assis
 Cardinal
 Ricardinho

6 goals
 Jé

5 goals

 Cristian Borruto
 Cirilo
 Sergei Sergeev
 Lozano
 Denys Ovsyannikov
 Yevgen Rogachov

4 goals

 Maximiliano Rescia
 Falcão
 Rodrigo
 Andrés Reyes
 Jhonathan Toro
 Edwin Cubillo
 Ahmed Mohamed
 Kaoru Morioka
 Enmanuel Ayala
 Mladen Kocić
 Aicardo
 Fernandão
 Maxym Pavlenko

3 goals

 Leandro Cuzzolino
 Ari
 Gabriel
 Rafael
 Vinícius
 Angellott Caro
 Ramadan Samasry
 Gabriel Lima
 Kotaro Inaba
 Ahmad Al-Farsi
 Dmitri Prudnikov
 Vidan Bojović
 Borja
 Jordi Torras
 Suphawut Thueanklang

2 goals

 Martín Amas
 Tobias Seeto
 Simi
 Wilde
 Jorge Abril
 Yefri Duque
 Luis Navarrete
 Diego Zúñiga
 Michal Belej
 Ibrahim Bougy
 Alan Aguilar
 Walter Enríquez
 Afshin Kazemi
 Mohammad Taheri
 Marco Ercolessi
 Humberto Honorio
 Alex Merlim
 Sergio Romano
 Shota Hoshi
 Wataru Kitahara
 Shaker Al-Mutairi
 Abdulrahman Al-Taweel
 Mohammed Rahoma
 Morgan Plata
 Alquis Alvarado
 Michael De Leon
 Claudio Goodridge
 Miguel Lasso
 Fernando Mena
 Carlos Pérez
 Juan Salas
 Matos
 Aleksandr Fukin
 Pula
 Robinho
 Pavel Suchilin
 Vladimir Lazić
 Slobodan Rajčević
 Micah Leaalafa
 Alemao
 Álvaro
 Lin
 Miguelín
 Ortiz
 Jirawat Sornwichian
 Kritsada Wongkaeo
 Serhiy Chepornyuk
 Oleksandr Sorokin

1 goal

 Santiago Basile
 Hernán Garcías
 Matías Lucuix
 Alamiro Vaporaki
 Aaron Cimitile
 Greg Giovenali
 Danny Ngaluafe
 Yeisson Fonnegra
 Johann Prado
 Jose Quiroz
 Alejandro Serna
 Marek Kopecký
 Tomáš Koudelka
 Lukáš Rešetár
 Michal Seidler
 Matěj Slovacek
 Ahmed Abou Serie
 Mizo
 Mostafa Nader
 Erick Acevedo
 Estuardo De León
 Armando Escobar
 José Rafael González
 Masoud Daneshvar
 Ahmad Esmaeilpour
 Ali Asghar Hassanzadeh
 Ali Rahnama
 Hossein Tayyebi
 Jairo dos Santos
 Marcio Forte
 Luca Leggiero
 Giuseppe Mentasti
 Rafael Henmi
 Nobuya Osodo
 Hamad Al-Awadhi
 Ahmed Fathe
 Victor Quiroz
 Jorge Rodríguez
 Aziz Derrou
 Youssef El-Mazray
 Adil Habil
 Yahya Jabrane
 Mohammed Talibi
 Apolinar Gálvez
 Óscar Hinks
 Fabio Alcaraz
 Adolfo Salas
 Walter Villalba
 Marinho
 Nandinho
 Vladislav Shayakhmetov
 Slobodan Janjić
 Bojan Pavićević
 Bule
 Samuel Osifelo
 Elliot Ragomo
 Stevenson
 Anthony Talo
 Kike
 Keattiyot Chalaemkhet
 Jetsada Chudech
 Dmytro Fedorchenko
 Petro Shoturma
 Serhiy Zhurba

Own goals
 Jhonathan Toro (playing against Brazil)
 Jairo Toruño (playing against Paraguay)
 Saad Assis (playing against Spain)
 Alemao (playing against Russia)

Awards
The following awards were given for the tournament:

Tournament ranking
Per statistical convention in football, matches decided in extra time are counted as wins and losses, while matches decided by penalty shoot-out are counted as draws.

Symbols

Official song

The official song of 2012 FIFA Futsal World Cup was "Heart & Soul", a single by the Thai band Slot Machine.

References

External links
FIFA Futsal World Cup Thailand 2012, FIFA.com
FIFA Technical Report

 
2012
FIFA World Cup
FIFA Futsal World Cup
2012
FIFA Futsal World Cup